Blažo Đukanović (26 November 1883 in Lukovo, Nikšić, Principality of Montenegro – 21 October 1943 in Ostrog monastery, Italian governorate of Montenegro) was a Montenegrin Serb Chetnik brigadier general and political leader in the Italian governorate of Montenegro.

Đukanović completed gymnasium and his university education in Russia. Since 1939 he served as a judge at the High Military Court of Yugoslavia. He became the Ban of the Zeta Banovina in 1941, right up until the dissolution of the Kingdom of Yugoslavia. In 1941 he was elected the commander of all Chetnik forces in Montenegro, and local general Bajo Stanišić acknowledged him as an official spokesman of the Montenegrin Chetniks.

As the leader of the Montenegrin Chetniks, on 24 July 1942 he signed a deal with the Italian army represented by General Pirzio Biroli whereby he became the head of the Central Nationalist Committee(GNE), which also included Zelenaši forces. This post made him de facto leader of Montenegro and he held it until 19 October 1943, near the date of his death. From 9 to 21 October 1942, Đukanović visited Montegrin cities in order to improve cooperation between Italian occupier and local civic administration. Zelenaši members of GNE lead by Voja Nenadić wanted to limit Đukanović's pro-Chetnik influence. Nenadić's faction gained majority in GNE, however, with great help from Draža Mihailović and Pavle Đurišić, Đukanović stayed as head of GNE. He had been ambushed by Yugoslav Partisans at the Ostrog Monastery. Eventually he was captured and shot along with Jovan Tošković at the walls of lower Ostrog.

References

Sources
 
 
 

1883 births
1943 deaths
Military personnel from Nikšić
People of the Principality of Montenegro
Serbs of Montenegro
Montenegrin Chetnik personnel of World War II
Montenegrin soldiers
Executed military personnel
Executed Montenegrin people
20th-century executions
People killed by Yugoslav Partisans
Montenegrin collaborators with Nazi Germany
Montenegrin collaborators with Fascist Italy
Bans of the Kingdom of Yugoslavia
Burials at Serbian Orthodox monasteries and churches
Executed Yugoslav collaborators with Nazi Germany